Jacques Antoine Charles Bresse (9 October 1822, Vienne, Isère – 22 May 1883) was a French civil engineer who specialized in the design and use of hydraulic motors.

Bresse graduated from the École Polytechnique in 1843 and received his formal education in engineering at the École des Ponts et Chaussées. He returned to the École des Ponts et Chaussées in 1848 as an instructor for applied mechanics courses and in 1853 gained his professorship in applied mechanics, after which he taught at the school until his death in 1883.

His name is one of the 72 names inscribed on the Eiffel Tower.

Publications
 Bresse, Jacques Antoine Charles, Water-wheels; Or, Hydraulic Motors, John Wiley & Sons, New York 1869.

Notes

French civil engineers
École Polytechnique alumni
École des Ponts ParisTech alumni
Corps des ponts
1822 births
1883 deaths
People from Vienne, Isère
Members of the French Academy of Sciences